SM Aslam Talukder (14 April 1964 – 17 February 2008), known by his stage name Manna was a successful Bangladeshi film actor and producer.

In his 24 years career he has acted in more than three hundred films. He is called the latest Mahanayak of the Dhallywood Golden Era.
One of the first films that brought him to attention was Danga (1992). Other commercially successful movies are Traash, Chadabaaz and Amma Jaan.

Montajur Rahman Akbar's Shanto Keno Mastan and Ke Amar Baba were released in 1998 and 1999. In 1999, the movie 'Ammajan' directed by Kazi Hayat released. The film established Manna into a permanent position in Bangla film history as it was one of the most successful commercial films of Bengali film history.

On average, Manna acted in 10 films each year. Among films released last year, he played lead roles in commercially successful films including Saajghor, Khomotar Garom, Moner Sathe Juddho, Machine Man, Ulta Palta 69 and Shotru Shotru Khela. Manna received several prestigious awards including a National Film Award for Best Actor in 2005.

As an action hero, Manna acted in collaboration with action director Kazi Hayat's 20 films & Montazur Rahman Akbar's 22 films.

Filmography

References

External links 
 

Male actor filmographies
Bangladeshi filmographies